Salvador García Melchor (born 1 November 1962) is a Mexican marathon runner who won the New York Marathon in 1991 in a time of 2:09:28. He also won the 1992 Rotterdam Marathon in a time of 2:09:16. Other notable wins include the 1988 Mexico City Marathon (2:19.02) and the 1991 Long Beach Marathon (2:16.08). He finished second in the 1990 New York marathon with a time of 2:13.19.

Marathons

Source: Association of Road Racing Statisticians.

References

1962 births
Living people
Mexican male long-distance runners
Mexican male marathon runners
New York City Marathon male winners
Athletes (track and field) at the 1991 Pan American Games
Pan American Games competitors for Mexico
20th-century Mexican people